Signal Hill is a city  in area in Los Angeles County, California. Located high on a hill, the city is an enclave completely surrounded by the city of Long Beach. Signal Hill was incorporated on April 22, 1924, roughly three years after oil was discovered there. As of the 2010 census, the city population was 11,016.

Etymology
Signal Hill was originally known as Los Cerritos (“The Little Hills") but got its current name when it became the signal point of the United States Coast and Geodetic Survey in 1889.

History

The hill that the city is named after is 365 feet (110 m) above the surrounding town of Long Beach.

After the Spanish claimed  Alta California ("Upper California," or what is now the state of California), Signal Hill eventually became part of the first large rancho grant to be allotted under Spanish rule in Alta California. The Rancho San Pedro (Dominguez Rancho) land grant exceeded  as granted to a soldier, Juan Jose Dominguez, who accompanied Junipero Serra, by Governor Fages through authority of King Carlos III of Spain in 1784.

Between 1913 and 1923 an early California movie studio, Balboa Amusement Producing Company (also known as Balboa Studios), was located in Long Beach and used 11 acres (45,000 m2) on Signal Hill for outdoor locations. Buster Keaton and Fatty Arbuckle were two of the Balboa Studios actors who had films shot on Signal Hill.

Before oil was discovered in Signal Hill, there were large homes built on the hill itself, and in the lower elevations was an agricultural area where fruits, vegetables, and flowers were grown.

Discovery of oil

Signal Hill changed forever when oil was discovered. The hill would soon become part of the Long Beach Oil Field, one of the most productive oil fields in the world. On June 23, 1921, Royal Dutch Shell's Alamitos #1 well  erupted. The gas pressure was so great the gusher rose 114 ft (35 m) in the air. Soon Signal Hill was covered with over 100 oil derricks, and because of its prickly appearance at a distance became known as "Porcupine Hill". Today, many of the original oil wells and pumpjacks are gone, although Signal Hill is still a productive oil field and several wells and derricks still remain. Signal Hill is now a mix of residential and commercial areas.

The city was incorporated on April 22, 1924. Among the reasons for incorporation was avoiding annexation by Long Beach with its zoning restrictions and per-barrel oil tax. Proving to be a progressive city, Signal Hill elected as its first mayor, Mrs. Jessie Nelson. She was California's first female mayor.

Government
Signal Hill has a council-manager form of government. The City Council has five members who are elected to four-year, staggered terms; council members elect the mayor from among their ranks.

On the Los Angeles County Board of Supervisors, Signal Hill is represented by 4th District Supervisor Janice Hahn.

Emergency services
The Signal Hill Police Department provides local law enforcement. In 2018, it budgeted for 38 police officers to enforce the law in the 2 square mile municipality.

Basic life support and ambulance transport is provided by Care Ambulance Service

The Long Beach Memorial Medical Center provides medical services to the City and LACFD Station 60.
 
The Los Angeles County Department of Health Services operates the Whittier Health Center in Whittier, serving Signal Hill.

Fire
The Los Angeles County Fire Department provides fire protection services for the city of Signal Hill.

Economy
Prior to its dissolution, the airline Jet America Airlines was headquartered in Signal Hill. The diner chain Hof's Hut is headquartered in Signal Hill.

Top employers
According to the city's 2017 Comprehensive Annual Financial Report, the top employers in the city are:

Education

Primary and secondary school

Public schools
Signal Hill is served by Long Beach Unified School District.

There are two operating elementary schools within the city limits: Signal Hill Elementary School and Juan Bautista Alvarado Elementary School. The former Burroughs Elementary School and adjacent Teacher Resource Center now serves as office space for the Head Start Program. Juan Bautista Alvarado Elementary School is located on the site of the former all male boarding school, the Southern California Military Academy. There is one middle school within the city limits: Jessie Elwin Nelson Academy. High school students usually attend Long Beach Polytechnic High School (usually referred to as Long Beach Poly), although some students choose to attend Long Beach Wilson Classical High School. 
Signal Hill Elementary School has earned the California Achieving Schools Award, and the National Achieving Schools Award. Signal Hill and Alvarado are both California Distinguished Schools.

Colleges and universities
Community college students attend one of the two nearby campuses for Long Beach City College.

California State University, Long Beach and DeVry University are located less than five miles (8 km) away.

American University of Health Sciences (AUHS) is located within the city of Signal Hill.  The university offers an education in Allied Healthcare, offering degrees such as a Bachelor and Master of Science in Nursing (BSN; MSN), Master of Science in Clinical Research (MSCR), Bachelor of Science in Pharmaceutical Science (BSPS), and a Doctorate of Pharmacy (PharmD) program.

City parks

Although a small town, Signal Hill has several parks. It is adjacent to City Hall, the Community Center and the Library. The park has picnic tables, a playground, basketball courts, a softball field, and restrooms. There is also an amphitheater where there are weekly outdoor concerts during the summer.

Hilltop Park   is at the top of Signal Hill and is very popular for its great views. There are several telescopes in the park. There is also some public artwork in the park and a mist tower. This park is a popular location for hiding geocaches. On a clear day you can see as far as the Santa Monica mountains, downtown LA, the large mountains behind it, all of the communities in between, most of Long Beach, down the South Bay area to Newport Beach, and out to sea Catalina Island. It is a view of the LA Basin entailing roughly 10 million people. Part of the view is blocked by homes.

Reservoir Park   near the California Heights neighborhood of Long Beach is a large grassy area with picnic tables next to a 4.7 million gallon water reservoir.

Discovery Well Park  ,      flat is near the original well on Signal Hill.

Near the Panorama Promenade, there is the Unity Sculpture, a 12' height sculpture atop a 4' pedestal with a seating courtyard that is dedicated in memory of the victims of September 11.

There are also several pedestrian-only trails that travel between various parks and roadways. Hiking along these trails, as well as on the sidewalks in Signal Hill is very popular. Some sections can be found that are between a 15% and 25% grade.

Proposed nature preserve
On the north slope of Signal Hill is a large area that is currently used for oil operations. This area has been proposed as a nature preserve.

Geography
The city is surrounded on all sides by the city of Long Beach, California.

Signal Hill lies in the 562 area code. The city once shared three different postal ZIP codes with the city of Long Beach but in July 2002, the city of Signal Hill received its own ZIP code, 90755.

Climate
According to the Köppen Climate Classification system, Signal Hill has a semi-arid climate, abbreviated "BSk" on climate maps.

Demographics

2010
The 2010 United States Census reported that Signal Hill had a population of 11,016. The racial makeup of Signal Hill was 4,650 (42.2%) White (30.3% Non-Hispanic White), 1,502 (13.6%) African American, 83 (0.8%) Native American, 2,245 (20.4%) Asian, 135 (1.2%) Pacific Islander, 1,778 (16.1%) from other races, and 623 (5.7%) from two or more races. Hispanic or Latino of any race were 3,472 persons (31.5%).

The Census reported that 10,970 people (99.6% of the population) lived in households, 2 (0%) lived in non-institutionalized group quarters, and 44 (0.4%) were institutionalized.

There were 4,157 households, out of which 1,419 (34.1%) had children under the age of 18 living in them, 1,580 (38.0%) were opposite-sex married couples living together, 660 (15.9%) had a female householder with no husband present, 258 (6.2%) had a male householder with no wife present.  There were 302 (7.3%) unmarried opposite-sex partnerships, and 156 (3.8%) same-sex married couples or partnerships. 1,128 households (27.1%) were made up of individuals, and 245 (5.9%) had someone living alone who was 65 years of age or older. The average household size was 2.64.  There were 2,498 families (60.1% of all households); the average family size was 3.33.

The population was spread out, with 2,624 people (23.8%) under the age of 18, 1,034 people (9.4%) aged 18 to 24, 3,476 people (31.6%) aged 25 to 44, 2,970 people (27.0%) aged 45 to 64, and 912 people (8.3%) who were 65 years of age or older.  The median age was 36.0 years. For every 100 females, there were 97.3 males.  For every 100 females age 18 and over, there were 94.9 males.

The homeowner vacancy rate was 1.9%; the rental vacancy rate was 5.7%.  5,253 people (47.7% of the population) lived in owner-occupied housing units and 5,717 people (51.9%) lived in rental housing units.

According to the 2010 United States Census, Signal Hill had a median household income of $70,442, with 14.1% of the population living below the federal poverty line.

2000
As of the census of 2000, there were 9,333 people, 3,621 households, and 2,096 families residing in the city. The population density was 4,182.0 inhabitants per square mile (1,615.9/km2). The racial makeup of the city was 45.5% White, 13.0% African American, 0.6% Native American, 16.5% Asian, 2.1% Pacific Islander, 16.2% from other races, and 6.2% from two or more races. Hispanic or Latino of any race were 29.0% of the population.

There were 3,621 households, out of which 31.0% had children under the age of 18 living with them, 36.8% were married couples living together, 14.5% had a female householder with no husband present, and 42.1% were non-families. 30.6% of all households were made up of individuals, and 5.2% had someone living alone who was 65 years of age or older.  The average household size was 2.56 and the average family size was 3.34.

In the city, the population was spread out, with 26.4% under the age of 18, 9.1% from 18 to 24, 35.3% from 25 to 44, 22.0% from 45 to 64, and 7.2% who were 65 years of age or older.  The median age was 33 years. For every 100 females, there were 97.1 males.  For every 100 females age 18 and over, there were 96.1 males.

The median income for a household in the city was $48,938, and the median income for a family was $46,439. Males had a median income of $41,487 versus $36,460 for females. The per capita income for the city was $24,399.  About 13.6% of families and 17.2% of the population were below the poverty line, including 31.1% of those under age 18 and 3.9% of those age 65 or over.

See also

Long Beach Oil Field has more details on the giant oilfield that includes Signal Hill
Long Beach Municipal Cemetery
Signal Hill (disambiguation) for other Signal Hills

References

Bibliography

External links

Chamber of Commerce
The Story of Oil in California - Signal Hill at The Paleontological Research Institution
The Geology of Signal Hill, CA at Museum of the Earth
- Discover Well ALAMITOS NO. 1 June 25, 1921. California  Registered Landmark NO. 580 
The Balboa Amusement Producing Company: The Unforgotten Studio of Long Beach

 
Cities in Los Angeles County, California
Gateway Cities
Los Angeles Harbor Region
Enclaves in the United States
Petroleum in California
Populated places established in 1924
1924 establishments in California
Incorporated cities and towns in California